The men's 5000 metre relay competition in short track speed skating at the 2022 Winter Olympics will be held on 11 February (semifinals) and 16 February (finals), at the Capital Indoor Stadium in Beijing. The Canadian team won gold, with South Korea winning silver and Italy the bronze.

The defending champion were Hungary, with China and Canada being second and third in 2018. The Netherlands were the 2021 World Short Track Speed Skating champion, Hungary and Italy were the silver and bronze medalists, respectively. Many top athletes did not participate in the championship, however. Canada were leading the 2021–22 ISU Short Track Speed Skating World Cup with four races completed before the Olympics, followed by South Korea and Hungary.

Qualification

The top with the top 8 countries qualified a relay through the 2021–22 ISU Short Track Speed Skating World Cup, including host nation China.

Records
Prior to this competition, the existing world and Olympic records were as follows.

Results

Semifinals

Finals

Final B

Final A

Controversy
During the semifinals of the event, the Chinese team fell with 10 laps to go. There was no obvious obstruction on the Chinese skater, but they were advanced to the A final, with no team disqualified during the race. The Chinese team were advanced, even though they finished last in the race and there was no impeding action on the team.

References 

Men's short track speed skating at the 2022 Winter Olympics